NGC 3281 is a large unbarred spiral galaxy in the southern constellation of Antlia, located at a distance of  from the Milky Way. The galaxy is inclined by an angle of 64° to the line-of-sight from the Earth, with the major axis aligned with a position angle of 137°. It is a luminous infrared galaxy and a type II Seyfert galaxy. NGC 3281 is a member of the Antlia Cluster, which belongs to the Hydra–Centaurus Supercluster.

References

Unbarred spiral galaxies
Antlia
3281
18340502
031090